Bintagoungou  is a rural commune and village of the Cercle of Goudam in the Tombouctou Region of Mali. The village lies at the south east corner of Lake Faguibine near the channel that connects Lake Faguibine to Lake Takara. The commune includes all of Lake Takara and a small section at the eastern end of Lake Faguibine.
 
The commune includes eight settlements:
Alphahou Abarbouch
Alphahou Inataben
Alphahou Taraba
Bintagoungou
Etewel
Taxina
Tihigrène
Toufazrouf

References

Communes of Tombouctou Region